Qazyan or Qəziyan or Qəzyan or Kaziyan may refer to:
Qazyan, Qubadli, Azerbaijan
Qazyan, Tartar, Azerbaijan
Qazyan, Ujar, Azerbaijan
Qaziyan, Iran
Qazian-e Olya, Iran
Qazian-e Sofla, Iran